Jean-Baptiste Santerre (23 March 1651 – 21 November 1717) was a French painter and draughtsman of the Style Louis XIV, known for his history paintings, portraits, and portrait-like genre subjects. Considerably influenced by Italian masters of the Bolognese school as well as his French contemporaries, Santerre nonetheless made an original contribution in his art, being among the first French painters to bring Netherlandish influences.

Born in Magny-en-Vexin near Pontoise, Santerre studied notably under the history painter Bon Boullogne, and trained by copying works by Old Masters. After achieving initial success as a portrait painter by the late 1690s, Santerre began to branch out into the fields of genre painting and, in which he combined the fantasy portrait of Northern tradition, as seen in the art of Rembrandt and Gerrit Dou, with the allegorical portrait, then fashionable in France. At the same time, he also painted history paintings and altarpieces of biblical and religious subjects, suffused with a strong erotic character; notable case of these is Susanna at the Bath of 1704, regarded among Santerre's best known works. Santerre's successes gained the attention from the French royalty, notably including King Louis XIV and Philippe II, Duke of Orléans; from 1715 and until his death, Santerre served as a court painter for the Duke of Orleans.

Santerre's work brought him a controversial reputation, in light of his association with the French Regency era; it was during the 19th and 20th centuries when it met a broader appreciation. Santerre is regarded as a precursor of the Rococo era painting, as well as of both Neoclassical and Romantic painting, and was said to be an influence on subsequent generations of artists during the said eras.

Life and work
Born in Magny-en-Vexin near Pontoise on 23 March 1651, Jean-Baptiste Santerre was the twelfth child of André Santerre, a merchant. He was apprenticed to the portrait painter François Lemaire (1620–1688), before entering the studio of the history painter Bon Boullogne. Although he executed some history paintings, he began to specialize in portraits early in his career, influenced by his French contemporaries Hyacinthe Rigaud and François de Troy; at the same time, Santerre became among the first painters in France to bring Dutch and Flemish influences, notably from Rembrandt and Anthony van Dyck. In his art, Santerre made an original contribution by combining the fantasy portrait of Northern tradition with the allegorical portrait, then fashionable in French painting.

Having been approved (agrée) into the Academy of Painting and Sculpture in 1698, Santerre was accepted as full member (reçu) in October 1704, after presenting Susanna at the Bath, now in the Louvre, and an untraced portrait of the painter Noël Coypel; also in 1704, he exhibited some of his works at the Salon. Santerre's success at the Academy provided him official commissions for more conventional portraits, among them that of the mother of King Louis XV, Marie Adélaïde of Savoy, influenced by the elder Troy's portrait of the Duchess of Maine. Beside from Susanna at the Bath and a Weeping Magdalen, Santerre's religious paintings notably include Ecstasy of Saint Teresa, a commission by King Louis XIV for the Chapel of Versailles that caused a scandal in ecclesiastical circles, given the subject's erotic character inspired by Bernini's statue.

Towards 1712, Santerre received a pension from the King, as well as a studio and lodging in the Louvre. After Louis XIV's death in 1715, Santerre became an ordinary painter at the court of the Regent of France, the Duke of Orleans; among his later works are a portrait of the Regent now in the Birmingham Museum and Art Gallery, exhibiting an influence from Rigaud's portraiture, and a double portrait in the Palace of Versailles of the Regent and his mistress, Madame de Parabère, with the latter appearing as Minerva. Adam and Eve of c. 1716–1717, also believed to be a double portrait of the Regent and Madame de Parabère, turned out to be Santerre's last work, made shortly before his death on 21 November 1717; on his death, he was reputed to have destroyed a notebook of his nude studies, which he considered to be indecent.

In culture
Santerre's death is the subject of a 1836 painting by Joseph-Léon-Roland de Lestang-Parade (1810–1881), first exhibited in Paris during that year's Salon and now hosted in the Museum of Fine Arts, Lyon.

Gallery

Notes

References

Bibliography

Primary sources
 
 
 
 
 
General studies
 
 
 
Additional studies
 
 
 
 
 
 
 
 
 
 
 
 
 
 
Reference works
 
 
 
 
 
 
 
 
 
 
 

1651 births
1717 deaths
People from Val-d'Oise
17th-century French painters
French male painters
18th-century French painters
French portrait painters
People of the Regency of Philippe d'Orléans
18th-century French male artists